Richard Alexander Hough (15 May 1922 – 7 October 1999) was a British author and historian specializing in maritime history.

Personal life
Hough married the author Charlotte Woodyatt, whom he had met when they were pupils at Frensham Heights School, and they had five children, including the author Deborah Moggach, the children's author Sarah Garland, and Alexandra Hough, author of the textbook Hough’s Cardio Respiratory Care.

Literary career
Hough won the Daily Express Best Book of the Sea Award in 1972.

After leaving school, he joined the Royal Air Force at the beginning of World War II and received  his initial flight training at an airfield not far from Hollywood. He later flew Hurricanes and Typhoons.

He also wrote under the nom de plume Bruce Carter.

Among the 90 books he wrote were:

Into a Strange Lost World (1952), aka The Perilous Descent into a Strange Lost World
The Kidnapping of Kensington (1958), aka The Children Who Stayed Behind
Captain Bligh and Mr. Christian (1972)
The Deadly Freeze (1976)
Buzzbugs (1977)
Angels One Five (1979), aka Wings Against the Sky
The Fight of the Few (1980), aka The Raging Sky
The Fight to the Finish (1981), aka Wings of Victory
Nightworld (1987)

Bibliography as Richard Hough
  The Fight of the Few, 1979, Cassell ltd, Great Britain
  One Boy's War, Pen and Sword, 2008, 
  The Fleet that had to Die
  Admirals in Collision
  Dreadnought: A History of the Modern Battleship
  First Sea Lord: A life of Admiral Lord Fisher
  The Hunting of Force Z
  The Blind Horn's Hate
  Captain Bligh & Mr. Christian
  Louis and Victoria: the First Mountbattens
  Mountbatten: Hero of our Time
  Edwina
  The Pursuit of Admiral von Spee
  The Ace of Clubs: A History of the Garrick
  The Battle of Britain: the Jubilee History (with co-author Denis Richards)
  Winston & Clementine: the Triumphs & Tragedies of the Churchills
  Bless our Ship: Mountbatten and the Kelly
  Other Days Around Me (Autobiography)
  The Great Admirals, William Morrow and Company, New York, 1977 
  Edward and Alexandra: Their Private and Public Lives, London 1992, Hodder & Stoddart, .
  The Potemkin Mutiny
  Captain James Cook: A Biography, Hodder & Stoughton, London, 1994 
  The Great War at Sea, Oxford University Press, Oxford - New York, 1983 
  Buller's Guns 
  Buller's Dreadnought
  Buller's Victory
  Sister Agnes: The History of King Edward VII's Hospital for Officers 1899–1999. John Murray, London, 1998

Bibliography as Bruce Carter
 The Perilous Descent (Children's)
 Speed Six! (Children's)
 Four Wheel Drift (Children's)
 Kidnapping of Kensington (Children's)
 Razor Eyes(Children's)
 Miaow (Children's)
 B Flight (Children's)

References

External links
 

1922 births
1999 deaths
20th-century English historians
British World War II fighter pilots
People educated at Frensham Heights School
Royal Air Force pilots of World War II